Shahrak-e Qalat (also Romanized as Shahrak-e Qalāt; also known as Qalāt and Qelāt) is a village in Mobarakabad Rural District, in the Central District of Qir and Karzin County, Fars Province, Iran. At the 2006 census, its population was 858, in 193 families.

References 

Populated places in Qir and Karzin County